Jens Niehls (born 1 January 1951) is a German equestrian. He competed in two events at the 1972 Summer Olympics.

References

1951 births
Living people
German male equestrians
Olympic equestrians of East Germany
Equestrians at the 1972 Summer Olympics
Sportspeople from Halle (Saale)